The 2020 Alaska mid-air collision occurred at approximately 8:27 a.m. on July 31, 2020, when a de Havilland DHC-2 Beaver collided with a Piper PA-12 over the Kenai Peninsula, Alaska, approximately two miles northeast of Soldotna Airport, near mile 91.5 of the Sterling Highway. Alaska State Representative Gary Knopp was piloting one of the aircraft and was killed in the accident.

Victims 
All six occupants of the Beaver were killed as a result of the collision. Five died instantly, while the sixth person succumbed to their injuries during transport to the local hospital.

Gary Knopp, the pilot and sole occupant of the Piper, also died at the crash location. He was elected to the Alaska House of Representatives in 2016 and had been a long-time flight instructor and pilot. In his honor, Gov. Mike Dunleavy ordered U.S. and Alaska state flags to be flown at half-staff for three days.

Aircraft and accident 
The Beaver, manufactured in 1956 and operated by High Adventure Air Charter on lease from Soldotna Aircraft & Equipment Leasing LLC, was traveling from Longmere Lake to Cook Inlet for a fishing trip.

The Piper, manufactured in 1946, was privately owned by Knopp and departed from Soldotna Airport en route to Fairbanks. Knopp had been denied a medical certification in June 2012 for vision problems; after an appeal, the denial was upheld in July. In addition, although the Piper was registered to Knopp as N2587M, it had the aircraft registration number N1904T painted on the plane's exterior. N1904T had been reserved by Knopp but was not valid, causing the aircraft to be misidentified initially as a Piper Aztec.

The National Transportation Safety Board (NTSB) is investigating the crash. A preliminary report was issued in August 2020. The two aircraft had taken off at the same time (8:24 a.m. A witness stated he saw the Piper, traveling north, strike the rear fuselage of the Beaver, traveling west; after the impact, he saw what he thought was the Beaver's left wing separate from the aircraft, which entered an uncontrolled spin before crashing to the ground. Paint transfer from the Piper was found on the rear fuselage of the Beaver.

See also 
 
 
 2019 Alaska mid-air collision

References

External links
 
 NTSB investigation number: ANC20LA074. Basic data can be retrieved by searching for the investigation number in the CAROL Query (PDF download)
 
 
 

Aviation accidents and incidents in the United States in 2020
Accidents and incidents involving the de Havilland Canada DHC-2 Beaver
2020 in Alaska
July 2020 events in the United States
Aviation accidents and incidents in Alaska
Mid-air collisions
Mid-air collisions involving general aviation aircraft